Richard "Dick" Ira Bong (September 24, 1920 – August 6, 1945) was a United States Army Air Forces major and Medal of Honor recipient in World War II. He was one of the most decorated American fighter pilots and the country's top flying ace in the war, credited with shooting down 40 Japanese aircraft, all with the Lockheed P-38 Lightning fighter. He died in California while testing a Lockheed P-80 jet fighter shortly before the war ended. Bong was posthumously inducted into the National Aviation Hall of Fame in 1986 and has several commemorative monuments named in his honor around the world, including an airport, two bridges, a theater, a veterans historical center, a recreation area, a neighborhood terrace, and several avenues and streets, including the street leading to the National Museum of the United States Air Force in Dayton, Ohio.

Early life
Bong was born September 24, 1920, in Superior, Wisconsin, the first of nine children born to Carl Bong, an immigrant from Sweden, and Dora Bryce, who was an American of Scotch-English descent. Known by the common nickname "Dick", he grew up on a farm in Poplar, Wisconsin, where he became interested in aircraft at an early age while watching planes fly over the farm carrying mail for President Calvin Coolidge's summer White House in Superior, and was an avid model builder.

Bong entered Poplar High School in 1934, where he played the clarinet in the marching band and participated in baseball, basketball, and hockey. Because Poplar was a three-year school at the time, Bong transferred to Central High School in Superior for his senior year, graduating in 1938.

He began studying at Superior State Teachers College (the current-day University of Wisconsin–Superior) in 1938. While there, Bong enrolled in the Civilian Pilot Training Program and also took private flying lessons. On May 29, 1941, he enlisted in the Army Air Corps Aviation Cadet Program. One of his flight instructors was Captain Barry Goldwater (later a U.S. Senator from Arizona).

United States Army Air Forces
Bong's ability as a fighter pilot was recognized while he was training in northern California. He was commissioned a second lieutenant and awarded his pilot wings on January 19, 1942. His first assignment was as an instructor (gunnery) pilot at Luke Field, Arizona, from January to May 1942. His first operational assignment was on May 6 to the 49th Fighter Squadron (FS), 14th Fighter Group at Hamilton Field, California, where he learned to fly the twin-engine Lockheed P-38 Lightning.

On June 12, 1942, Bong flew very low ("buzzed") over a house in nearby San Anselmo, the home of a pilot who had just been married. He was cited and temporarily grounded for breaking flying rules, along with three other P-38 pilots who had looped around the Golden Gate Bridge on the same day. For looping the Golden Gate Bridge, flying at a low level down Market Street in San Francisco, and blowing the clothes off of an Oakland woman's clothesline, Bong was reprimanded by General George C. Kenney, commanding officer of the Fourth Air Force, who told him, "If you didn't want to fly down Market Street, I wouldn't have you in my Air Force, but you are not to do it any more and I mean what I say." Kenney later wrote, "We needed kids like this lad."

In all subsequent accounts, Bong denied flying under the Golden Gate Bridge. Nevertheless, Bong was still grounded when the rest of his group was sent without him to England in July 1942. Bong then transferred to another Hamilton Field unit, 84th Fighter Squadron of the 78th Fighter Group. From there, Bong was sent to the Southwest Pacific Area.

Bong was then flown overseas as a passenger aboard a B-24 Liberator from Hawaii via Hickam Field to Australia. Upon arrival Bong was assigned to a newly formed P-38 fighter unit, the 17th Fighter Squadron (Provisional). By November 1942 Bong was transferred to the 49th Fighter Group (49th FG), 9th Fighter Squadron (9th FS). “The Flying Knights” were flying the P-40 Warhawk and were famous for their aerial defense of Darwin from March 1942 until August 1942. Afterwards, the 9th Fighter Squadron was one of two units in the 5th Air Force selected for conversion to the P-38 Lightning.  Bong was among a group of new pilots in the South-West Pacific Area (SWPA) with experience flying the new twin engine fighter, and they helped these pilots convert from the P-40 Warhawk and P-39 Airacobra to the P-38 Lightning.

In November, while the squadron waited for delivery of the scarce P-38s, Bong and other 9th FS pilots were reassigned temporarily to fly missions and gain combat experience with the 39th Fighter Squadron, 35th Fighter Group, based in Port Moresby, New Guinea. On December 27, Bong claimed his initial aerial victory, shooting down a Mitsubishi A6M "Zero", and a Nakajima Ki-43 "Oscar" over Buna (during the Battle of Buna-Gona). For this action, Bong was awarded the Silver Star.

Bong rejoined the 9th FS, by then equipped with P-38s, in January 1943; the 49th FG was based at Schwimmer Field near Port Moresby. In April, he was promoted to first lieutenant. On July 26, Bong claimed four Japanese fighters over Lae, in an action that earned him the Distinguished Service Cross. In August, he was promoted to captain.

While on leave to the United States the following November and December, Bong met Marjorie Vattendahl at a Superior State Teachers' College homecoming event and began dating her.

After returning to the southwest Pacific in January 1944, he named his P-38 "Marge" and adorned the nose with her photo. On April 12, Captain Bong shot down his 26th and 27th Japanese aircraft, surpassing Eddie Rickenbacker's American record of 26 credited victories in World War I. Soon afterwards, he was promoted to major by General Kenney and dispatched to the United States to see General "Hap" Arnold, who gave him a leave.

After visiting training bases and going on a 15-state bond promotion tour, Bong returned to New Guinea in September. He was assigned to the V Fighter Command staff as an advanced gunnery instructor with permission to go on missions but not to seek combat. Bong continued flying from Tacloban, Leyte, during the Philippines campaign; by December 17, he had increased his air-to-air victory claims to 40.

Bong considered his gunnery accuracy to be poor, so he compensated by getting as close to his targets as possible to make sure he hit them. In some cases he flew through the debris of exploding enemy aircraft, and on one occasion collided with his target, which he claimed as a "probable" victory.

On the recommendation of General Kenney, the Far East Air Force commander, Bong received the Medal of Honor from General Douglas MacArthur in a special ceremony in December 1944. Bong's Medal of Honor citation says that he flew combat missions despite his status as an instructor, which was one of his duties as standardization officer for V Fighter Command. His rank of major would have qualified him for a squadron command, but he always flew as a flight (four-plane) or element (two-plane) leader.

In January 1945, Kenney sent America's ace of aces home for good. Bong married Vattendahl on February 10, 1945. He participated in numerous PR activities, such as promoting the sale of war bonds.

Death

Bong then became a test pilot assigned to Lockheed's plant in Burbank, California, where he flew P-80 Shooting Star jet fighters at the Lockheed Air Terminal.  On August 6, 1945, he took off to perform the acceptance flight of P-80A 44-85048. It was his 12th flight in the P-80; he had a total of four hours and fifteen minutes of flight time in the jet.

The plane's primary fuel pump malfunctioned during takeoff. Bong either forgot to switch to the auxiliary fuel pump, or for some reason was unable to do so. Bong cleared away from the aircraft, but was too low for his parachute to deploy. The plane crashed into a narrow field at Oxnard Street and Satsuma Avenue, North Hollywood. His death was front-page news across the country, sharing space with the first news of the bombing of Hiroshima.

The I-16 fuel pump had been added to P-80s after an earlier fatal crash. Captain Ray Crawford, a fellow  P-80 test/acceptance flight pilot who flew on August 6, later said Bong had told him that he had forgotten to turn on the I-16 pump on an earlier flight.

In his autobiography, Chuck Yeager writes that part of the culture of test flying at the time, due to its fearsome mortality rates, was anger toward pilots who died in test flights, to avoid being overcome by sorrow for lost comrades. Bong's brother Carl, who wrote his biography, questions whether Bong repeated the mistake so soon after mentioning it to another pilot. Carl's book – Dear Mom, So We Have a War (1991) – contains numerous reports and findings from the crash investigations.

Legacy

In the mid-1950s, construction on a new USAF installation commenced south of Milwaukee that was to be named Richard I. Bong Air Force Base.  The base, intended to be an Air Defense Command fighter base for the Chicago and Milwaukee areas, was conceived in the early 1950s with construction commencing in the mid-1950s. Construction had barely begun when the base was transferred to the Strategic Air Command as a prospective base for the supersonic B-58 Hustler bomber.  Prior to completion, the base was considered obsolete as it had become apparent to USAF officials that the base would be redundant with installations nearby that would soon have space for more units. The base was abandoned in 1959 and disposed of the following year.  Today, the former base site is known as the Richard Bong State Recreation Area.  

This base is not to be confused with the planned renaming of Spokane Air Force Base, Washington, as Bong Air Force Base, which was the planned name of that facility until General Muir Fairchild died on active duty in 1950, cementing "Fairchild" onto the name of the current Fairchild Air Force Base.  

Bong is buried at Poplar Cemetery in Poplar, Wisconsin.

Aerial victory credits

Military awards
Bong's military decorations and awards include:

Medal of Honor citation

Rank and organization: Major, United States Army Air Forces
Place and date: Over Borneo and Leyte, October 10 to November 15, 1944
Entered service at: Poplar, Wisconsin
Birth: Poplar, Wisconsin
G.O. No.: 90, December 8, 1944

Commemoration
 Richard Bong State Recreation Area on the site of what was to be Bong Air Force Base in Kenosha County, Wisconsin
 Richard I. Bong Memorial Bridge along US Route 2 in the Twin Ports of Duluth, Minnesota and Superior, Wisconsin
 Richard I. Bong Airport in Superior, Wisconsin
 Bong Barracks of the Aviation Challenge program
 Major Richard I. Bong Bridge on Macarthur Drive, Annandale, Townsville, Australia
 Major Richard Ira Bong Squadron of the Arnold Air Society at the University of Wisconsin
 Richard Bong Theatre in Misawa, Japan and the 613th Air and Space Operations Center, Thirteenth Air Force, Hickam Air Force Base, Hawaii.
 Bong Avenues on the former site of the decommissioned Richards-Gebaur Air Force Base, on Lackland AFB in San Antonio, Texas, on Luke AFB in Glendale, Arizona, on Elmendorf AFB in Anchorage, Alaska, Fairchild AFB in Spokane WA and on Kadena AFB in Okinawa, Japan. Bong Blvd on Barksdale AFB in Bossier City, Louisiana. 
 Bong Terrace, Mount Holly Township, New Jersey (Mount View neighborhood, built 1956–1957).
 Bong Street, Dayton, Ohio, leading to the National Museum of the United States Air Force, and on Holloman AFB near Alamogordo, NM.
 National Aviation Hall of Fame (1986)
 Wisconsin Aviation Hall of Fame (1987).
Bong was named as the class exemplar at the United States Air Force Academy for the Class of 2003.
International Air and Space Hall of Fame (2018)

Richard I. Bong Veterans Historical Center
The Richard I. Bong Veterans Historical Center in Superior, Wisconsin is housed in a structure intended to resemble an aircraft hangar, and contains a museum, a film screening room, and a P-38 Lightning restored to resemble Bong's plane.

See also
List of Medal of Honor recipients for World War II
Thomas McGuire, American combat pilot with the second-most enemy planes shot down, World War II

Notes

References

Bong, Carl & O'Connor, Mike.  1985. "Ace of Aces, The Dick Bong Story." 2nd Edition;

External links

}

1920 births
1945 deaths
Accidental deaths in California
American people of Swedish descent
American World War II flying aces
United States Army Air Forces Medal of Honor recipients
Aviators from Wisconsin
Aviators killed in aviation accidents or incidents in the United States
People from Superior, Wisconsin
Recipients of the Silver Star
Recipients of the Distinguished Flying Cross (United States)
Recipients of the Distinguished Service Cross (United States)
Recipients of the Air Medal
U.S. Air Force Test Pilot School alumni
United States Army Air Forces officers
United States Army Air Forces pilots of World War II
University of Wisconsin–Superior alumni
World War II recipients of the Medal of Honor
Military personnel from Wisconsin
Burials in Wisconsin
People from Door County, Wisconsin
Victims of aviation accidents or incidents in 1945